Bishopstone is a village and former civil parish, now in the parish of Seaford, in the Lewes district, in the county of East Sussex, England. Bishopstone Village has a population of about 200 people, including the nearby hamlet of Norton. It is located on a no-through country lane west of the town of Seaford, in the South Downs National Park.

History

Bishopstone was an episcopal manor, hence its name meaning "dwelling place of the bishop". The church, dedicated to Saint Andrew, is thought to date from the 8th century, and may well be the oldest in the county. Bishopstone church has an ancient canonical sundial above its porch. The sundial is inscribed with the name Eadric, probably Eadric of Kent, the King of Kent in 685/6. The church was rebuilt in 1200.

Bishopstone village hall is part of the village life and has local events, it is also the venue for the local table tennis club and is located behind the church. There are no shops or pubs in the village.

In 1931 the parish had a population of 409. On 1 April 1934 the parish was abolished and merged with East Blatchington, Newhaven and South Heighton.

Notable residents
In the 7th century the village is believed to have been the home of a saint, Leofwynn; she was venerated locally in the Dark Ages and medieval times.

The poet James Hurdis was born in the village and there is a memorial to him in the church. The writer and "clairvoyante" Nell St. John Montague is buried in Bishopstone, and her name is included on a memorial for the war dead (she died in London during a bombing in World War II).

Transportation
Bishopstone is served by Bishopstone railway station, which replaced the original station, Bishopstone Beach Halt in 1942. Bishopstone station was built in 1938 in a distinctive red-brick Charles Holden based Art Deco style, a house style common to the Southern Railway at the time. An integrated pill box was added later above the roof early in World War 2 because of the defensive coverage it gave over the nearby bay and beaches. From Bishopstone railway station there is a regular train service eastwards to Seaford, and north-westwards to Lewes, Brighton, Gatwick, and London.

See also

 Tide Mills

References

External links
St Andrews church

Villages in East Sussex
Former civil parishes in East Sussex
Seaford, East Sussex